Nabil El Amraoui, known as Cheb, is a Moroccan singer-songwriter and comedian from Oulmes, Morocco. He has been described as a talented lyricist with a keen interest in traditional Moroccan music.

Biography 
He started studying music at 15, at first with the guitar, followed by the  after 2 or 3 years from studying guitar, the oud, the violin, and the piano and synthesizer.

Influences 
He is influenced by Zayane Berber folk music, having grown up with the sounds of Mohamed Rouicha, Azlmat, and Hadda Ouakki. He is also influenced by the chaabi songs played at weddings and parties in Rabat's al-Kamra neighborhood, as well as the raï songs of artists such as Cheb Hasni, Cheb Mami, Khaled, Cheb Nasro, Cheb Bilal, and Cheb Rizki that would play at the billiard halls. Among chaabi influences, Cheb cites , Miloud Lamghari, El Bhiri, Najat Aatabou, as well as old names of aita music. Later on, with satellite dishes, he was introduced to sharqi, or Middle Eastern music, and with the internet, rock, metal, and jazz. Cheb has also expressed an appreciation for the music of Ziad Rahbani.

Music 
Cheb is an internet sensation, with cult popularity on YouTube. His music has been described as "purely Moroccan," making use of authentic chaabi rhythms.

Lyrics 
Cheb writes his songs in "pure" Darija, or Moroccan vernacular Arabic. The lyrical content of his music has been described as idiosyncratic, at once mundane and profound. His song al-mā'an ( "The Dishes") in particular has drawn attention.

Albums 
 Tkharshish, 2018
Akhar as-Sa'alik al-Muhtaramin, 2019
Sma’ Balak, 2021

Songs 

Hammam alzalqin (حمّام الزّالِݣين), 2021
Doremifasolasi (دو ري مي فا صو لا سي), 2021
Helahoppa (هيلاهوبا), 2021
Wslatkom Chi Haja Mn Chamch ? (وصلاتكم شي حاجة من شمش؟ )2021

Sma’ Balak (سمع بالاك), 2021
Reklam (ريكلام), 2021
Fi Tabi'atin Ma (في طبيعة ما), 2020
Dwaqa Wlla... Ghellaqa? (ذواقة ولا غلاقة؟), 2020
Scandale (سكونضال), 2020
Fi Intidhar Sandwich (في انتظار السندويش), 2021
Doar Al Alam Attaleth (دوار العالم الثالث), 2020
Hna El Caramel (حنا الكراميل), 2020
Ajmal Balad Fi Al Alam (اجمل بلد فالعالم!), 2020
Saifan (صيفا), 2020

Akhar as-Sa'alik al-Muhtaramin, 2019
Bghina Lil Maysalich (بغينا الليل ميساليش), 2019
Kutukutu (كوتوكوتو), 2019
Ghabra d Njom (غبرة دنجوم), 2019
Fin A Smaïn? (فين اسماعين؟), 2019
Hassan (حسن), 2019
An Lma'en (عن الماعن), 2019
Majanin (مجانين), 2019
Tajine El Hout (طجين الحوت), 2019
Lloha (اللوحة), 2019
L'ars (العرس), 2019
Zin Zin Zin (زين زين زين), 2019

Tkharshish, 2018

 Wakha? (واخا؟), 2018
Douar Al Alam Al Thaleth (دوار العالم الثالت), 2018
Sir O Aji (سير و اجي), 2018
Lahrira (الحريرة), 2018
Choclatati' (شكلاطتي), 2018
L'ayach' (العياشة), 2018
Lhazqa (الحزقة), 2018
Lhsab Sabon (الحساب صابون), 2018
Sgo'ya (صكوعية), 2018
Comparse (كومبارس), 2018
Nti Dnya Nti? (نتي دنيا نتي؟), 2018
260 (٢٦٠), 2018
Sfar o Rose (صفر وغوز), 2018

References 

Living people
21st-century Moroccan male singers
Moroccan songwriters
People from Oulmes, Morocco
1990 births